Tina Maria Rättyä (born 12 November 1968 in Jakobstad, Ostrobothnia) is a retired Finnish heptathlete, who was nicknamed Tinuli. She is the cousin of Susann Sundqvist.

She finished thirteenth at the 1991 World Championships and the 1993 World Championships, tenth at the 1994 European Indoor Championships, eighth at the 1994 European Championships and sixteenth at the 1995 World Championships.

References

sports-reference

1968 births
Living people
People from Jakobstad
Finnish heptathletes
Athletes (track and field) at the 1992 Summer Olympics
Olympic athletes of Finland
Sportspeople from Ostrobothnia (region)